This is a list of listed buildings in Aarhus Municipality, Denmark.

External links
 Danish Agency of Culture

Aarhus Municipality
Aarhus